Hitchcock Run is a stream in the U.S. state of West Virginia.

Hitchcock Run was named after William Hitchcock.

See also
List of rivers of West Virginia

References

Rivers of Ritchie County, West Virginia
Rivers of West Virginia